The 3rd constituency of the Loire (French: Troisième circonscription de la Loire) is a French legislative constituency in the Loire département. Like the other 576 French constituencies, it elects one MP using a two round electoral system.

Description

The 3rd constituency of the Loire lies to the east of Saint-Etienne in the south of the department. The largest town in the constituency Saint-Chamond sits on the main road between Saint-Etienne and Lyon.

Between its creation in its modern form in 1988 and 2017 the seat was represented by François Rochebloine of the centre right. He finally lost his seat to En Marche! in the landslide election of that year.

Assembly Members

Election results

2022

 
 
|-
| colspan="8" bgcolor="#E9E9E9"|
|-
 
 

 
 
 
 
 

* Le Jaouen ran as a LREM dissident. LREM's alliance, Ensemble Citoyens, supported Mandon.

2017

2012

References

3